Anna Chuk (born 29 August 1983) is a Bulgarian rower. She competed in the women's coxless pair event at the 2004 Summer Olympics.

References

External links
 

1983 births
Living people
Bulgarian female rowers
Olympic rowers of Bulgaria
Rowers at the 2004 Summer Olympics
Sportspeople from Plovdiv